A carousel or carrousel (mainly North American English), merry-go-round (international), roundabout (British English), or hurdy-gurdy (an old term in Australian English, in SA) is a type of amusement ride consisting of a rotating circular platform with seats for riders. The "seats" are traditionally in the form of rows of wooden horses or other animals mounted on posts, many of which are moved up and down by gears to simulate galloping, to the accompaniment of looped circus music.

Carousels are commonly populated with horses, each horse weighing roughly 100 lbs (45 kg), but may include a variety of mounts, for example pigs, zebras, tigers, or mythological creatures such as dragons or unicorns. Sometimes, chair-like or bench-like seats are used, and occasionally mounts can be shaped like aeroplanes or cars.

The names carousel and merry-go-round are also used, in varying dialects, to refer to a distinct piece of playground equipment.

History

Early carousels

The modern carousel emerged from early jousting traditions in Europe and the Middle East. Knights would gallop in a circle while tossing balls from one to another; an activity that required great skill and horsemanship.  This game was introduced to Europe at the time of the Crusades from earlier Byzantine and Arab traditions. The word carousel originated from the Italian Carosella  and Spanish Carosella ("little battle", used by crusaders to describe a combat preparation exercise and game played by Turkish and Arabian horsemen in the 12th century). This early device was essentially a cavalry training mechanism; it prepared and strengthened the riders for actual combat as they wielded their swords at the mock enemies.

By the 17th century, the balls had been dispensed with, and instead, the riders had to spear small rings that were hanging from poles overhead and rip them off. Cavalry spectacles that replaced medieval jousting, such as the ring-tilt, were popular in Italy and France. The game began to be played by commoners, and carousels soon sprung up at fairgrounds across Europe. At the Place du Carrousel in Paris, an early make believe carousel was set up with wooden horses for the children.

Another kind of carousel emerged in the 17th century in Belgium and France to celebrate special events. This was a ceremonial parade of knights and noblemen on horseback around a courtyard, accompanied by tournaments and various equestrian demonstrations and games, including the spearing of cardboard heads of "Moors" and "Saracens". The most famous carousel of this kind was held by Louis XIV in June, 1662, in the courtyard of the Tuileries Palace, to celebrate the birth of his son and heir. The site of the event, next to the Louvre, is still known as "the Carrousel".

By the early 18th century carousels were being built and operated at various fairs and gatherings in central Europe and England. Animals and mechanisms would be crafted during the winter months and the family and workers would go touring in their wagon train through the region, operating their large menagerie carousel at various venues. Makers included Heyn in Germany and Bayol in France. These early carousels had no platforms; the animals would hang from chains and fly out from the centrifugal force of the spinning mechanism. They were often powered by animals walking in a circle or people pulling a rope or cranking.

By 1803 John Joseph Merlin had a carousel in his Mechanical Museum in London, where gentry and nobility liked to gather on winter evenings. The horses "floated free over a pole". It was connected to a "big musical instrument that played a fully orchestrated concerto" and from the first note, the carousel would start turning while each horse would make a galloping movement with a visitor riding on its back. Merlin did not patent his inventions and engineers were allowed to come to create their own models of his creations.

Direction of rotation

Viewed from above, in the United Kingdom, merry-go-rounds, called "gallopers" by the showmen community when populated by model horses, usually turn clockwise (from the outside, animals face to the left), while in North America and Mainland Europe, carousels typically go counterclockwise (animals face to the right).

Modern carousels
By the mid-19th century the platform carousel was developed; the animals and chariots were fixed to a circular floor that would suspend from a centre pole and rotate around. These carousels were called dobbies and were operated manually by the operator or by ponies.

In mid-19th-century England, the carousel became a popular fixture at fairs. The first steam-powered mechanical roundabout, invented by Thomas Bradshaw, appeared at the Pot Market fair in Bolton in about 1861. It was described by a Halifax Courier journalist as "a roundabout of huge proportions, driven by a steam engine which whirled around with such impetuousity, that the wonder is the daring riders are not shot off like cannon- ball, and driven half into the middle of next month."

Soon afterwards, English engineer Frederick Savage began to branch out of agricultural machinery production into the construction of fairground machines, swiftly becoming the chief innovator in the field. Savage's fairground machinery was exported all over the world. By 1870, he was manufacturing carousels with Velocipedes (an early type of bicycle) and he soon began experimenting with other possibilities, including a roundabout with boats that would pitch and roll on cranks with a circular motion, a ride he called 'Sea-on-Land'.

Savage applied a similar innovation to the more traditional mount of the horse; he installed gears and offset cranks on the platform carousels, thus giving the animals their well-known up-and-down motion as they travelled around the center pole – the galloping horse. The platform served as a position guide for the bottom of the pole and as a place for people to walk or other stationary animals or chariots to be placed. He called this ride the 'Platform Gallopers'. He also developed the 'platform-slide' which allowed the mounts to swing out concentrically as the carousel built up speed. Fairground organs (band organs) were often present (if not built in) when these machines operated. Eventually electric motors were installed and electric lights added, giving the carousel its classic look.

These mechanical innovations came at a crucial time, when increased prosperity meant that more people had time for leisure and spare money to spend on entertainment. It was in this historical context that the modern fairground ride was born, with Savage supplying this new market demand. In his 1902 Catalogue for Roundabouts he claimed to have "... patented and placed upon the market all the principal novelties that have delighted the many thousands of pleasure seekers at home and abroad."

In the United States, the carousel industry was developed by immigrants, notably Gustav Dentzel of Germany and Charles W.F. Dare from England, from the late 19th century. Several centers and styles for the construction of carousels emerged in the United States:
 Coney Island style – characterized by elaborate and sometimes faux-jeweled saddles, as well as mirrors to catch and reflect lights. This style was pioneered by Charles I. D. Looff.
 Philadelphia style – known for more realistically painted saddles, this style was pioneered by Dentzel and the Philadelphia Toboggan Company.
 Country Fair style – often with no saddles at all, this style was pioneered Allan Herschell and Edward Spillman of western New York, and Charles W. Parker of Kansas. 

The golden age of the carousel in America was the early 20th century, with large machines and elaborate animals, chariots, and decorations being built.

Antique and notable carousels
The National Carousel Association maintains a list of Historic Carousel Award winners, primarily focused on carousels in Canada and America.

Pre-1869

1870–1879

1880–1889

1890–1899

1900–1909

1910–1919

1920–1929

1930–1939 
 The King Arthur Carrousel has existed since 1932 and was moved to Disneyland in 1954. It is an assembly of two carousels. Walt Disney wanted it to have four courses of all jumpers. The remaining chariot woodwork was repurposed as the "Calliope" tenders of Casey Jr. Circus Train powered gravity coaster.

1940–1949 
 The carousel at Harper Motors is an iconic landmark on the North Coast of California. It was bought by the dealerships owner Harvey Harper in 1991, after purchase this 1947 Allan Herschell Carousel was shipped to Oakland by train and drive to Eureka in a semi-truck. It took a year to assemble on site. It was refurbished and repainted in 2013 which caused the ride to be closed for a month. It is open daily free of charge to the public from 12–4 except on holidays and when inclement weather doesn't allow for riders.

Unique and record breaking 
 The carousel at Phantasialand in Germany is one of the biggest in the world, made by Preston & Barbieri one historical amusement ride factory in Italy.
 The world's only two-row stationary carousel built from an original Dentzel blueprint left in existence, the Highland Park Dentzel Carousel and Shelter Building, is located in Highland Park in Meridian, Mississippi.
 In May 2005, William Henry Dentzel III, built the world's first solar-powered carousel. The carousel operates during Solfest at the Solar Living Institute in Hopland, California.
 There is only one carousel in the world that rides in a waving motion – "Over the Jumps: The Arkansas Carousel" in Little Rock, Arkansas. It is also the only remaining wooden track carousel built by the Herschell & Spillman Company, and one of only four track carousels still in existence.
 The carousel at Conneaut Lake Park in Conneaut Lake, Pennsylvania is the last T.M. Harton Carousel that is still in operation and its Artizan band organ is one of two known of the same model in the world.
 In 2007, SeaWorld Orlando opened Sea Carousel, Florida's first aquatic carousel.
 In 2012, Buttonwood Park Zoo opened an Americana carousel by Chance Rides.
 In 2013, Palm Beach International Equestrian Center opened a Bertazzon Venetian Carousel as part of the Winter Equestrian Festival (the first carousel to be used in events besides South Florida Fair and the first Palm Beach County carousel built by Bertazzon)
 Binghamton, New York is considered the "Carousel Capital of the World" for the six original carousels in the Triple Cities area, donated by George F. Johnson, owner of the Endicott-Johnson Company early in the 20th century. These carousels, manufactured by the Allen Hershell Company in the "country fair" style, were donated with the express stipulation that they would never charge admission for anyone to ride them. Apparently when Mr. Johnson was a child he was frequently too poor to ride the local carousel and he vowed this would never happen to another child in the area. The carousel at the Ross park zoo in Binghamton, NY does charge admission, in a way, as it requires the child to drop one piece of litter found in the park into a trash barrel in order to ride. This is all written on a plaque at the entrance to the carousel.{Greater Binghamton New York Convention and Visitors Bureau, visitbinghamton.org, March 2014} 

 The two double-decker Columbia Carousels built by Chance Rides and located at Six Flags Great America and California's Great America are the two tallest carousels in the world.
 The Merry-Go-Round at Bear Mountain State Park in New York, features hand-painted scenes of the Park and 42 hand-carved seats of native animals including black bear, wild turkey, deer, raccoon, skunk, Canada goose, fox, swan, bobcat, rabbit, and more.
 On Canada Day 2016, a new attraction was opened in Downtown Markham, Ontario. The Pride of Canada Carousel was commissioned by Christopher Bratty, current president of the real estate and development firm The Remington Group. The carousel was produced and originally envisioned by Shelley M. Shier of Broadway Bound Fine Arts and Entertainment for The Remington Group. The carousel sits inside a glass pavillon designed by Sheldon Levitt from Quardrangle Architects. The carousel itself features 44 ride-able reusable material sculptures representing different elements of Canadian culture. It was designed by artist Patrick Amiot who worked with the Brass Ring Carousel Company to build the ride.
 Ice floe carousels have been constructed on frozen lakes. For example, in 2017 an ice carousel was made in Finland. It was constructed by cutting the ice in a circle with a chainsaw.

In popular culture
 
 In Mary Poppins, Mary, Bert, and the children ride a merry-go-round, then leave the carousel on their horses to go off on a fox hunt and a horse race.
 In the film Charade, near the end, there is a scene where appears a carousel in the background with the music of the main theme, a Parisian waltz composed by Henry Mancini (Charade carousel) played with bells.
 In the film Logan's Run, the residents of a domed city of the future are doomed to die on their 30th birthday, unless they can be "renewed" in a ritual known as "carousel".
 In Something Wicked This Way Comes by Ray Bradbury, the carnival's carousel can cause riders to become younger or older depending on the direction, left and right in which they ride.
 Carousel (1945) was a Broadway musical featuring hit songs such as "If I Loved You" and "You'll Never Walk Alone". The protagonist, Billy Bigelow, is a carousel barker.
 In the dramatic climax scene of Alfred Hitchcock's Strangers on a Train (1951) the hero and the villain struggle on a carousel.
 David Carradine's 1983 film Americana revolves around a Vietnam veteran's obsession with the restoration of an abandoned carousel.
 In the Australian children's picture book The Carousel by Ursula Dubosarsky, illustrated by Walter di Qual, after an exhilarating ride on a carousel, a child has a semi-mystical vision of the carousel horses breaking free from the wheel and galloping across the world.
 The children's television programme The Magic Roundabout uses a carousel as its central motif.
 The film The Sting features a large indoor carrousel adjacent a brothel, where the Madame allows the girls to ride on slow nights.
 The three installments of the book series Kingdom Keepers: The Return by Ridley Pearson features the carousel from Disneyland being used as a time machine to the opening of Disneyland Park.
The carousel at House on the Rock is billed as the world's largest indoor carousel.
In 2014, American singer-songwriter, Melanie Martinez, released a song "Carousel", using carousel as a metaphor for love which goes in circles endlessly.
 The children's television programme Playdays had a roundabout called Rosie who was the focus of episodes broadcast on Wednesdays from 1992 to 1997, maintained by Mr. Jolly.

Gallery

See also 
 C. W. Parker Carousel
 Carousel of Progress—a theatre that revolves a seated audience around central stages
 Chair-O-Planes, aka a swing carousel
 Charles I. D. Looff
 Crescent Park Looff Carousel
 Herschell Carrousel Factory Museum
 Philadelphia Toboggan Company

References

External links

 The National Carousel Association
 The C. W. Parker Carousel Museum
 International Museum of Carousel Art
 Video of a hand-cranked carousel in Szentendre, Hungary
 Historic Carousels at the 1964–65 New York World's Fair
 The oldest carousel in the world
 How It's Made: Season 7: Episode 3: "Matches, Carousel Horses, Fine Porcelain, Automobile Fuel Tanks". 10 February 2008. 

 
Articles containing video clips
Amusement rides